The 2002 United States Senate election in Kansas was held on November 4, 2002. Incumbent Republican U.S. Senator Pat Roberts won re-election to a second term overwhelmingly. No Democrats filed to run, and Roberts was only opposed by a Libertarian candidate and a Reform Party candidate.

Republican primary

Candidates 
 Pat Roberts, incumbent U.S. Senator
 Tom Oyler, perennial candidate

Results

General election

Candidates 
 George Cook (Re)
 Pat Roberts (R), incumbent U.S. Senator
 Steven Rosile (L)

Predictions

Results

See also 
 2002 United States Senate election

References 

Kansas
2002
2002 Kansas elections